The Pipe School is located in Lanark, Wisconsin. It was added to the National Register of Historic Places in 1993 and built in 1889.

History
Members of the Jeffers family moved to Farmington in Waupaca County in 1855. 
Members of the Jeffers family have been in Wisconsin since they first settled in Racine County in the 1840s. They then moved to the town of Farmington in Waupaca County in 1855.

On Nov. 8, 1858, Truman Jeffers was married to Adeline Severance, daughter of Mr. and Mrs. John Severance. Adeline Severance was the first teacher of what is now known as the Pipe School in the town of Lanark. Truman Jeffers was living on what is now the William Pipe farm in Lanark in 1856. Adeline Severance Jeffers received a wage of $2.00 for a 5½-day week and boarded at home. Eliza Jeffers also taught there for $1.56 per week for four months.

Adolphis Kilby, husband of Ellen Jeffers, a daughter of George Jeffers, had a shoe shop across from the present William Pipe farm.

On Oct. 14, 1881, Julius Jeffers was married to Cordelia Thayer, who was the second teacher at the Pipe School. Family records show a long history of teachers, farmers and lumbermen. The Revolutionary War ancestor of the Jeffers family was a school teacher.

It was a one-room schoolhouse.

References

Schools in Portage County, Wisconsin
School buildings on the National Register of Historic Places in Wisconsin
National Register of Historic Places in Portage County, Wisconsin
One-room schoolhouses in Wisconsin